G. Satheesh Reddy is the Scientific Adviser to Raksha Mantri (the Minister of Defence), leading India's indigenous development of defence systems and technologies. He has worked on the development of missiles, fighter aircraft, unmanned aerial defence systems, and radar systems.

He is also the chairman of the Governing Body of the Aeronautical Development Agency, which developed the 4th Generation Light Combat Aircraft Tejas, which is being incorporated into active service.

Career 
He graduated in Electronics and Communication Engineering from Jawaharlal Nehru Technological University (JNTU), Anantapur and received his M.S & PhD from JNTU Hyderabad. He joined Defence Research and Development Laboratory (DRDL), Hyderabad in 1986, subsequently joining Research Centre Imarat (RCI) after its formation. First working as a navigation scientist and system manager, he eventually was elevated as a Distinguished Scientist in September of 2014 and was appointed as  a Scientific Adviser to the Defence Minister in May 2015. He was also appointed as the Secretary of the Department of Defence R&D and Chairman of the Defence Research and Development Organisation of India (DRDO) in Aug 2018.

Contributions 
Many navigation technologies and systems have been designed and developed by Dr. Reddy.

As Director at RCI, he led the development of IR seekers, integrated avionics modules, and other innovative systems. As Director General of Missiles and Strategic Systems, he oversaw the development of missile systems like BMD, Nag, QRSAM, Rudram, Long Range Guided Bomb etc.

He oversaw India's first successful test of an Anti-Satellite (ASAT) missile (Mission Shakti). He was involved in the development of the world's longest-range gun ATAGS, anti-radiation missiles, smart air field weapons, smart bombs, and missile assisted torpedo release systems.

Dr Reddy also pioneered in quickly diversifying DRDO's talent to effectively develop required technologies in the ongoing fight against the COVID-19 pandemic. Under his guidance, nearly 50 technologies for combating COVID have been developed and about 75 products have been transferred to 100 industries.

Awards and recognition
He is the first Indian in over 100 years to be conferred with the Honorary Fellowship and Silver medal by the Royal Aeronautical Society, London. The Royal Aeronautical Society recognised contributions of Dr Reddy towards indigenous design, development and deployment of diversified missile systems, aerospace vehicles, guided weapons and avionics technologies.

He has received numerous other awards including American Institute of Aeronautics and Astronautics (AIAA) Missile Systems Award. Other awards conferred on Dr Satheesh Reddy include the Aeronautical Prize, National Systems Gold Medal, National Design Award, IEI-IEEE (USA) Award for Engineering Excellence and the Homi J Bhabha Gold Medal.

References 

Living people
Date of birth missing (living people)
Engineers from Andhra Pradesh
1963 births
People from Nellore
Indian military engineers
20th-century Indian engineers